The AVN Award for Best Actress is an award that has been given by sex industry company AVN since the award ceremony's inception in 1984. As of January 2023, the titleholder is Maitland Ward.

Winners and nominees

1984–1989

1990–1994

1995–1999

2000–2004

2005–2009

2010–2014

2015–2019

2020–

See also
 AVN Award for Best Actor

References

Best Actress
Awards established in 1984